askMyGP is an online general practitioner consultation platform  launched in 2011 by GP Access Ltd, based in Leicestershire. 

It aims to improve patient access to healthcare and cut down on unnecessary appointments. The company claims only 30% of patients seeking help need a face-to-face appointment. It gives patients the option of submitting a symptom-related questionnaire online to a GP.  In January 2018, it was said to have managed 29,000 patient episodes in a dozen practices.

A pilot scheme backed by the Health and Social Care Board was introduced in Northern Ireland in 2016. This gave patients the option of explaining their symptoms to a receptionist by telephone or completing the same questionnaire on line themselves. 70% of the patients at a Falls Road, Belfast practice said it was an improvement. The algorithm gives GPs more information about the patient’s ailment than the traditional eight-to-10-minute face-to-face consultation.

It was introduced to the Riverside Group Practice in Portadown in 2016. The chair of the British Medical Association's Northern Ireland GP committee, said: "We introduced AskmyGP nine months ago at the practice where I work and there were complaints during the first two weeks while everyone got used to it, but now all the patients love it."  When tried at a practice in Ipswich it wasn’t favoured by all the staff at the surgery, but it was reported that "The ability to signpost to the free NHS physiotherapy self-referral service saves face to face surgery appointments.”

Dr Arnott, a single-handed GP with almost 5,000 patients in Burnbrae Medical Practice, Shotts, Lanarkshire signed up to it when she could not recruit partners to the practice. 60-70% of patients now use it and this has enabled the practice to expand without recruiting another doctor as the work can now be managed by a multidisciplinary team of advanced nurse practitioner, advanced practice physiotherapist, mental health worker and nurses skilled in long-term management. In November 2021 she  pulling the service until November 15 due to “clinical capacity” being at a “critical level”.

The Health Foundation conducted a study of 146 GP practices in England using askmyGP between 1 March 2019 and 30 September 2021 - during the COVID-19 pandemic in the United Kingdom. They analysed  7.5 million patient-initiated requests. There were concerns about the risk of digital tools creating inequalities by making it difficult for some patients to access care but patients often chose remote over face-to-face consultations.  Only 10% of requests were for face-to-face consultations by the end of the study period in September 2021. 

Four GP practices in Bury, Greater Manchester switched off access to the online consultation service in April 2022 because of the significant number of outstanding requests from patients that they had been unable to deal with. James Daly, the local MP, and local residents expressed concern that this would increase attendance at A&E.

References

General practice
Health software
Science and technology in Leicestershire